The College Board is an American nonprofit organization that was formed in December 1899 as the College Entrance Examination Board (CEEB) to expand access to higher education. While the College Board is not an association of colleges, it runs a membership association of institutions, including over 6,000 schools, colleges, universities, and other educational organizations.

The College Board develops and administers standardized tests and curricula used by K–12 and post-secondary education institutions to promote college-readiness and as part of the college admissions process. The College Board is headquartered in New York City. David Coleman has been the CEO of the College Board since October 2012. He replaced Gaston Caperton, former Governor of West Virginia, who had held this position since 1999. The current president of the College Board is Jeremy Singer.

In addition to managing assessments for which it charges fees, the College Board provides resources, tools, and services to students, parents, colleges, and universities in college planning, recruitment and admissions, financial aid, and retention.

History

The College Entrance Examination Board (CEEB) was founded at Columbia University on December 22, 1899, by representatives of 12 universities and three high school preparatory academies. These were:
 Columbia University
 Colgate University
 University of Pennsylvania
 New York University
 Barnard College
 Union College
 Rutgers University
 Vassar College
 Bryn Mawr College
 Women's College of Baltimore (now Goucher College)
 Princeton University
 Cornell University
 Newark Academy
 Mixed High School, New York
 Collegiate Institute, New York

The organization's intent was to "adopt and publish a statement of the ground which should be covered and of the aims which should be sought by secondary school teaching in each of the following subjects (and in such others as may be desirable), and a plan of examination suitable as a test for admission to college: Botany, Chemistry, English, French, German, Greek, History, Latin, Mathematics, Physics, Zoology". According to the board's plan of organization, the exam fee was $5, around $155 in 2020.

CEEB code

The College Board maintains a numbered registry of countries, college majors, colleges, scholarship programs, test centers, and high schools. In the United States, this registry is borrowed by other institutions as a means of unambiguous identification; thus, a student might give his or her guidance department a college's name and address and its CEEB code to ensure that his or her transcript is sent correctly. There exists a similar set of ACT codes for colleges and scholarships, centers, and high schools; however, these codes are less widely used outside ACT, Inc.

Tests and programs

SAT and SAT Subject Tests

The SAT is a fee-based standardized test for college admissions in the United States, first administered in 1926. The College Board decides how the SAT is constructed, administered, and used in the United States. Educational Testing Service (ETS) develops, administers, publishes, and scores the SAT. The SAT covers writing, reading, and mathematics. SAT scores range from 400 to 1600, with each of the two sections—Evidence-based Reading and Writing and Mathematics—worth up to 800 points. Most students take the test during their junior or senior year of high school. In the marketplace, the SAT competes with the ACT, another standardized college admissions test.

The basic test is $49.50, and the optional essay section costs another $15. Also, various fees can accumulate—registering later results in a $30 fee, registering by phone results in a $15 fee, and changing a test date, center, or test type results in a $30 fee. The waitlist testing fee is $53, and each score report costs $12. Additionally, students sitting the test in regions outside the United States pay an additional 'Non-U.S. Regional Fee' of between $43 and $53. As a result, student testing fees may run up to $200 or more for a single test. However, fee waivers and reductions are available for some low-income students.

On March 5, 2014, the College Board announced that a redesigned version of the SAT would be administered for the first time in 2016. The exam reverted to the 1600-point scale, and the essay became optional. The testing process was changed to give students three hours to take the exam plus 50 additional minutes to complete the essay. In the same announcement, the College Board also said they would be partnering with Khan Academy to make available, from spring 2015, free test preparation materials for the redesigned SAT. This included a preparation application to help students practice and identify areas of improvement. Practice problems and videos demonstrating step-by-step solutions were also made available.

The SAT Subject Tests are intended to measure student performance in specific areas, such as mathematics, science, and history. A student may take up to three SAT Subject Tests on any given date at a flat rate. There is a per-administration registration fee of $26, plus a flat fee of $22 ($26 in the case of language tests with listening) for each test the student plans to take.

On May 13, 2015, the College Board announced the release of a new credential initiative to get students more interested in careers focused in STEM with a Project Lead the Way partnership.

In March 2020, College Board announced the cancellation of several test dates during the spring of 2020, due to the COVID-19 pandemic.

On January 19, 2021, the College Board discontinued Subject Tests. This was effective immediately in the United States. The following summer, the tests were to be phased out for international students. It also announced the discontinuation of the optional essay section after June 2021.

On January 25, 2022, College Board announced that the SAT will be delivered digitally in an attempt to change the format of test itself. Vice President of the College Readiness Assessment at College Board, Priscilla Rodriguez, states “ The digital SAT will be easier to take, easier to give and more relevant”. Some new features of this digital version of the SAT include: a 2 hours testing period instead of the 3 hours period that has been used for the current SAT, more relevant topics that cover material that is given in college courses, and calculators will be allowed the entirety of the Math portion of the exam. Digital versions of the exam gives College Board the opportunity to address inequities that are associated with student accessibility to technology by providing students who don’t have computers on testing days. This new change was brought forth by College Board following disruptions in testing that were COVID related. The 2021 SAT Suite of Assessment Program results showed that 1.5 million high school students took compared to the 2.2 million students in 2020 who participated taking this test.

PSAT/NMSQT

The PSAT/NMSQT is a fee-based standardized test that provides firsthand practice for the SAT for a cost of $17. It also functions as a qualifying test for the National Merit Scholarship Corporation's scholarship programs. There are also other forms of the PSAT, including the PSAT 10 and the PSAT 8/9. However, it is important to note that the PSAT 10 and the PSAT 8/9 do not qualify a student for the National Merit Scholarship.

Advanced Placement Program

The College Board's Advanced Placement Program is an extensive program that offers high school students the chance to participate in what the College Board describes as college-level classes, reportedly broadening students' intellectual horizons and preparing them for college work. It also plays a large part in the college admissions process, showing students' intellectual capacity and genuine interest in learning. The program allows many students to gain college credit for high performance on the AP exams, which cost $97 each, much in the same manner as the CLEP. Granting credit, however, is at the discretion of the college. Two thousand nine hundred colleges grant credit or advanced standing. Critics of the Advanced Placement Program charge that courses and exams emphasize the breadth of content coverage instead of depth.

In May 2020, glitches prevented some students from submitting their AP exams, forcing those students to re-take them in June.

College Level Examination Program

The College Level Examination Program (CLEP) provides students of any age, including high schoolers, college students, homeschooled students, adults, senior citizens, children, and exceptional toddlers, with the opportunity to demonstrate college-level achievement through a program of exams in undergraduate college courses. Two thousand nine hundred colleges grant credit for passing CLEP exams.

Accuplacer
The College Board's Accuplacer test is a computer-based placement test that assesses reading, writing, and math skills. The Accuplacer test includes reading comprehension, sentence skills, arithmetic, elementary algebra, college-level mathematics, and the writing test, Writeplacer. The Accuplacer test is used primarily by more than 1,000 high schools and colleges to determine a student's needed placement. Often community colleges have specific guidelines for students requiring the Accuplacer test. The Accuplacer Companion paper-and-pencil tests allow students with disabilities (Specifically students with an Individualized Education Program or 504 Plan) to take the test through its braille, large print, and audio tests. The biggest benefit of the Accuplacer and Accuplacer Companion tests is their ability to be scored immediately through an online scoring system and taken in remote locations. While there are normally no fees for taking the test, some institutions may charge a fee to retake the test. Note that if a testing institution is not local, an examinee may be required to arrange a proctor for the test. If so, a local library may be willing to serve as a proctor as there are not many other options for individuals in this case. Most schools will only test their own admissions candidates.

SpringBoard
SpringBoard is a pre-Advanced Placement program created by the College Board to prepare students who intend to take AP courses or college-level courses in their scholastic careers. Based on Wiggins and McTighe's "Understanding by Design" model, the SpringBoard program attempts to map knowledge into scholastic skill sets in preparation for Advanced Placement testing and college success. Units of instruction are titrated to students within and across all school grades, providing a vertically articulated curriculum framework that scaffolds learning skills and subject test knowledge. Implicit in the course curriculum, the program embeds pre-AP and AP teaching and learning strategies across grade school levels and classwork.

The curriculum applies to grades 6 through 12. Teachers are provided with formative assessments, professional training, and various teaching tools to track student progress. The instructional framework is integrated into the curriculum content and subject materials. SpringBoard also provides other Web 2.0 resources aimed at making the program more community-oriented.

Truinfadores 
On June 23, 2020, The College Board and NBCUniversal Telemundo Enterprises launched a joint public campaign Truinfadores in order to help guide primarily Spanish-speaking families through their child’s college planning process. This campaign will offer funding to scholarships that are included in the College Board Opportunity Scholarship program that encourages students to apply for a chance to earn $40,000 dollars towards their college tuition. These scholarships are open to any student, regardless of their citizenship status and are strictly reserved for students who’s household income is less than $60,000 .

CSS Profile

The College Board also offers the CSS/Financial Aid PROFILE, a financial aid application service that many institutions use in determining family contribution and financial assistance packages. Students also must pay a $25 fee to apply and another $16 for each additional school to which they submit the profile.

Criticism
Criticism of the Board and its exams is known to go back to at least 1922, with a Harvard Alumni Bulletin article from prep school teacher Morgan Barnes. Barnes took ten different examinations "in cognito qua candidate", requested the graded booklets of his exams, and attempted to confront some readers who scored them. Among Barnes' grievances were general incompetence in grading, excessive focus on exam preparation in classrooms, and overreliance on exam scores in the college admissions process.

Since the late 1970s, the College Board has been subject to criticism from students, educators, and consumer rights activists. The College Board owns the SAT, and many students must take SAT exams for admission to competitive colleges. Some colleges also require students to submit a College Board CSS/Financial Aid PROFILE when applying for financial aid. As there are no broadly accepted alternatives to College Board products such as AP, SAT Subject Tests, and CSS/Financial Aid, the company is often criticized as exploiting its monopoly on these products.

FairTest, an organization that advocates against over-dependence on standardized tests in school admissions, maintains that the SAT often underestimates the aptitude of African-American students and others. FairTest maintains a list of more than 1000 SAT-optional colleges on its website.

The consumer rights organization Americans for Educational Testing Reform (AETR) has criticized the College Board for violating its non-profit status through excessive profits and exorbitant executive compensation; nineteen of its executives make more than $300,000 per year, with CEO Gaston Caperton earning $1.3 million in 2009 (including deferred compensation). AETR also claims that College Board is acting unethically by selling test preparation materials, directly lobbying legislators and government officials, and refusing to acknowledge test-taker rights.

Exam fees
The SAT Reasoning Test with essay costs $64.50 ($93.50 if late) , the AP exams cost US$97 ($137 if late) , and taking AP exams is often a requirement for students taking AP classes. The SAT Subject Tests cost a baseline of $26 with a $22 fee for each test. Furthermore, numerous other services can be added to the basic costs, including late registration, score verification services, and various answering available services. SAT score reports cost $12 per college for 1–2-week electronic delivery or 2–4-week paper or disk delivery, depending on the school's method ($31 extra for two-day processing). The College Board allows high school administrators to authorize fee waivers for some services to students from low-income families, generally those meeting National School Lunch Act criteria. In addition, due to the competitive nature of the test, many students find it necessary to take preparatory courses or to have SAT tutoring, which can cost hundreds, sometimes thousands, of dollars.

Even the College Board's College Scholarship Service Profile (CSS), a college financial aid application meant to help students pay for college, requires a fee. For the 2018–19 school year, the price is $25 for the first report sent and an additional $16 for each additional college to receive the information.

In 2017, the College Board had $1.068 billion of revenue but spent only $927.8 million, leaving a $140 million surplus. Budget surpluses persist despite market-leading compensation packages for the College Board's executives – in 2009, the College Board paid out a $1.3 million/year package for CEO Caperton, more than the head of the American Red Cross or Harvard University. It paid nineteen executives more than $300,000 each per year.

Correlation between essay length and score
In 2005, MIT Writing Director Les Perelman plotted essay length versus essay score on the new SAT from released essays and found a high correlation between them. After studying 23 graded essays, he found that the longer the essay was, the higher its score. Perelman found that he could accurately determine the score of an essay without even reading the essay. In his study, he discovered that several of these essays were full of factual inaccuracies. The College Board does not claim to grade for factual accuracy.

Perelman, along with the National Council of Teachers of English, also criticized the 25-minute writing section of the test for damaging standards of writing taught in the classroom. They say that writing teachers training their students for the SAT will not instill revision, depth, and accuracy but will instead guide them to produce long, formulaic, and wordy pieces. "You're getting teachers to train students to be bad writers", concluded Perelman.

Advanced Placement classes
Some teachers have criticized AP classes as restrictive in the nature of their curriculum and yet indispensable due to the importance of AP classes in the college admissions process. The College Board can effectively control every aspect of AP classes directly or indirectly. The $97 fee, which is noted critically above, results only in a score report with the test name and grade. No details are given on how this scoring was reached nor are individuals given access to this information from College Board.

Additionally, starting with a pilot program in 2018 and officially rolling out to all schools in 2019, the College Board required students to sign up for AP tests during the fall before early-round college decisions are out. While the College Board stated that this was to ensure students commit to learning the material at the beginning of the year, the move drew criticism from students, stating that because they do not know whether or not the college they end up attending will grant credit for the test, the new, early registration deadline forces students to pay for tests that they will receive no benefit from. The College Board also charges $40 if a student does not sit for a test that they signed up for, meaning that many students who signed up for tests that would not grant them any credit still have to sit for those tests or pay the $40 fee.

Traditionally, AP exams are given in a school setting and last two to four hours. However, in 2020, due to the COVID-19 pandemic, the College Board released a new form of AP testing. Students were to take exams at home in a shortened 45-minute, open-book format. During the exams, there were reports of disruptions in tests.

Reporting errors
In March 2006, it was discovered that the College Board had incorrectly scored several thousand tests taken in October 2005. Although the Board was aware of the error as early as December, it waited months to respond, and in late March, schools still did not have the correct details. Within days of the first announcement, the Board corrected the number of affected students upward.

Many colleges use the SAT score to decide acceptance and scholarships. The late reporting of errors upset many high-profile colleges. The dean of admissions at Pomona College commented, "Everybody appears to be telling half-truths, and that erodes confidence in the College Board...It looks like they hired the people who used to do the books for Enron".

Sale of student data
, the College Board charges $0.47 per name for access to student information. An investigation by the New York Civil Liberties Union revealed that one of the College Board's customers was JAMRS, a military recruitment program run by the United States Department of Defense. The College Board and ACT have been sued over the use of this information. In addition, there is criticism that students are not sufficiently made aware that their data is being sold, or that disclosure of certain data is optional. The College Board has received substantial backlash for these practices.

Recycling SAT exams
On August 25, 2018, the SAT given in America was a recycled October 2017 international SAT given in China. The leaked PDF file was on the internet before the August 25, 2018 exam.

Relationship with Hanban 
In October 2020, the College Board announced its intention to terminate financial ties with Hanban, in place since 2006, following a letter from U.S. senators critical of the relationship.

See also
 ACT, a test by ACT, Inc., the main competitor to the College Board's SAT
 College admissions in the United States
 IB Diploma Programme, a pre-university educational program administered by the International Baccalaureate, the main competitor to the College Board's Advanced Placement (AP) Program
 Writing assessment

References

External links

 

Organizations based in New York City
Organizations established in 1899
1899 establishments in New York City
Standardized tests in the United States
United States schools associations